Salvador Díaz Carias (born 23 June 1933) is a Venezuelan chess FIDE Master (FM) (2021) and two-time Venezuelan Chess Championship winner (1960, 1978).

Biography
Salvador Díaz developed into one of Venezuela's leading chess players between 1953 and 1960. Beginning in 1961, he reduced his chess activities and worked initially as a mathematics teacher, and from 1965 on as a programmer at IBM.

At the Venezuelan Chess Championship in 1958, Díaz came in shared first place but lost the playoff 2.5 : 3.5 against Antonio Medina García. In 1960, he won the title in Maracaibo with 10.5 points from 11 games and defended it in 1961 in a match against Celso Sánchez Pouso. Díaz was able to win the national championship again in 1978.

Díaz took part in several World Chess Championship Zonal Tournaments:
 in 1957 in Caracas he reached 8th place with 6 points from 13 games,
 in 1967 in Caracas he finished 7th with 4.5 points from 10 games,
 in 1972 in Bogotá he came 12th with 6 points from 15 games.

Díaz played for Venezuela in the Chess Olympiads:
 in 1966, at the second board in the 17th Chess Olympiad in Havana (+9, =5, -6),
 in 1968, at the first reserve board in the 18th Chess Olympiad in Lugano (+9, =3, -3),
 in 1978, at the third board in the 23rd Chess Olympiad in Buenos Aires (+3, =2, -5).

In 2021, at the age of 88, Díaz was awarded the title of FIDE Master based on his performance in tournaments in the 1960s.

References

External links

Salvador Diaz chess games at 365chess.com

1933 births
Living people
Venezuelan chess players
Chess FIDE Masters
Chess Olympiad competitors
20th-century chess players
20th-century Venezuelan people
21st-century Venezuelan people